Breil may refer to:

Places
 Breil/Brigels, in Grisons, Switzerland
 Breil, Maine-et-Loire, in the Maine-et-Loire department, France
 Breil-sur-Roya, in the Alpes-Maritimes department, France

Other
 Breil (company), watches, jewelry and fragrance brands of the Binda Group
 Joseph Carl Breil (1870–1926), American composer, especially for silent films

See also
 Breuil (disambiguation)
 Le Breil (disambiguation)